Houben is a Dutch and Low German patronymic surname meaning "son of Houb". Houb was a nickname for Huibert/Huibrecht/Hubrecht (Hubert) in Brabant and Limburg. People with this surname include:

Claude Houben (born 1926), Belgian bobsledder
Francine Houben (born 1955), Dutch architect
Frank Houben (born 1939), Dutch politician
Fred Houben (born 1974), Dutch punk rock bass player
Heinrich Hubert Houben (1875–1935), German literary historian
Heinrich Hubert Maria Josef Houben (1875–1940), German chemist
Henri Houben (1858–1931), Belgian genre painter
Hilde Houben-Bertrand (born 1940), Belgian politician
Hubert Houben (1898–1956), German sprinter
Hubert Houben (born 1953), German historian
Jean-Marie Houben (born 1966), Belgian footballer
Joannes Andreas Houben (1821–1893), Dutch-Irish priest (Karel Houben, St. Charles of Mount Argus)
Josef Houben (1875–1940), German chemist
Max Houben (1898–1949), Belgian athlete and bobsledder
Philippe Houben (1881–?), Belgian-French waterpolo player
Reinhard Houben (born 1960), German politician
Robert J. Houben (1905–1992), Belgian politician
Rom Houben (born 1963), Belgian long-term coma patient
 Saul Houben (1922-1982), Belgian-French violinist concertmaster
Steve Houben (born 1950), Belgian jazz saxophonist and flutist
Stijn Houben (born 1995), Dutch footballer
Tuur Houben (born 1996), Belgian footballer

Given name
Houben R.T. (born 1970), Bulgarian painter

References

External links
Houben (surname) in the world

Dutch-language surnames
Patronymic surnames